The 5′ flanking region is a region of DNA that is adjacent to the 5′ end of the gene. The 5′ flanking region contains the promoter, and may contain enhancers or other protein binding sites. It is the region of DNA that is not transcribed into RNA. Not to be confused with the 5′ untranslated region, this region is not transcribed into RNA or translated into a functional protein. These regions primarily function in the regulation of gene transcription. 5′ flanking regions are categorized between  prokaryotes and eukaryotes.

Eukaryotic elements 
In eukaryotes, the 5′ flanking region has a complex set of regulatory elements such as enhancers, silencers, and promoters. The primary promoter element in eukaryotes is the TATA box. Other promoter elements found in eukaryotic 5′ flanking regions include initiator elements, downstream core promoter element, CAAT box, and the GC box.

Enhancer 
Enhancers are DNA sequences found in 5′ flanking regions of eukaryotic genes that affect transcription. If a transcription factor binds to an enhancer in a 5′ flanking region, the DNA strand bends in a way that the transcription factor that is bound to the enhancer can also bind the promoter of a gene. This leads to RNA polymerase recruitment and interaction with transcription factors and the promoter, and an overall higher transcription rate than the basal level. Although enhancers are usually present upstream of the transcription start site, they can be present anywhere on or around the gene of interest.

Silencer 
Silencers are DNA sequences found in the 5′ flanking region of eukaryotic genes, assisting in the silencing of a gene. They can be found upstream, downstream, or within the gene of interest. When repressors bind silencers, they act in a similar fashion as enhancers and bend over to prevent the interaction of RNA polymerase with promoters. This silences the gene and therefore the gene will not be expressed in the cell.

TATA box 
The TATA box is present in all genes that are transcribed by RNA polymerase II, which is most eukaryotic genes. The binding of the TATA box with TATA binding protein initiates the formation of a transcription factor complex. This is followed by binding of  transcription factor TFIID, which then recruits TFIIB, TFIIF, RNA polymerase II and TFIIH (in that order) to form an initiation complex. It is typically 10 nucleotides long, and is present -30 to -20 nucleotides upstream from the transcription start site, in the core promoter region.

CAAT box 
The CAAT box is a crucial element of the 5′ flanking region of eukaryotic genomes. A specific transcription factor called CAAT-binding protein binds to this region and aids in transcription in eukaryotes. It is typically 10 nucleotides long, and is present -80 to -70 nucleotides upstream from the transcription start site, in the proximal promoter region.

Prokaryotic elements 
Prokaryotes only have three promoter elements: two elements are present -35 and -10 nucleotides upstream of the transcription start site, and the third is directly upstream the transcription start site.  Prokaryotic promoter elements are not identical among species, but have a consensus sequence of 6 nucleotides each. Bacterial RNA polymerase binds to these regions to align itself and begin transcription. Promoter sequences that differ from the consensus sequence are generally transcribed less efficiently. Additionally, induced mutations in these -35 and -10 promoter sequences have proven to be deleterious to transcription.

Polymorphisms
Flanking SNPs are Single nucleotide polymorphisms (SNP) that appear in the flanking region. Polymorphisms in this region can lead to changes in the regulation of transcription. They have also been associated with a number of diseases. A 12 base pair insertion in the 5′ flanking region of the Cystatin B gene has been linked to some individuals with Unverricht-Lundborg disease. Polymorphisms in the 5′ flanking region of the DRD4 gene have been linked to ADHD, schizophrenia and methamphetamine abuse. Insertions and deletions in the 5′ flanking region of the insulin gene have been associated with type 2 diabetes. Polymorphisms in the 5′ flanking region of the gene coding for oxytocin have been linked to mutations in promoter function, ultimately leading to potential disorders related to altered oxytocin levels and functionality.

References

DNA